The Dave Clark Five were an English pop rock band which formed part of the British Invasion of beat music groups in the early-mid 1960s.

Albums

Studio albums (UK)

Studio albums (US and Canada)

Compilation albums

EPs

Singles

Notes

References

Discographies of British artists
Pop music group discographies
Rock music group discographies
Discography